This is a list of famous nurses in history.  To be listed here, the nurse must already have a Wiki biography article.  For background information see History of nursing and Timeline of nursing history.  For nurses in art, film and literature see list of fictional nurses.

A-D

Lady Harriet Acland (1750-1815), British noblewoman
Saint Alda (died c. 1309), Italian Catholic saint
Moyra Allen (1921-1996), helped develop the McGill Model of Nursing
Allen Allensworth (1842-1914) famous African-American American Civil War soldier who started as a nurse
Sir Jonathan Asbridge was the first president of the UK's Nursing and Midwifery Council
Charles Atangana (1880-1943), paramount chief of the Ewondo and Bane in Cameroon
Martha Ballard (1735-1812), American frontier midwife, great-aunt of Clara Barton
Nita Barrow (1916 - 1995), 5th Governor-General of Barbados who started as a nurse midwife and public health educator 
Ann A. Bernatitus (1912-2003), one of the Angels of Bataan — USN nurses in the Philippines in WW2
Clara Barton (1821-1912), organized the American Red Cross
Christine Beasley CBE (born 1944), Chiefing Nursing Officer for England
Irene L. Beland (1906-2000), American nursing educator, author of Clinical Nursing: Pathophysiological and Psychosocial Approaches
Claire Bertschinger Swiss-British nurse who inspired the Band Aid charity movement
Mary Ann Bickerdyke (1817-1901), nurse during the American Civil War known as "Mother Bickerdyke"
Florence Blake (1907-1983), American pediatric nursing professor and author
Florence A. Blanchfield (1884-1971), superintendent of the United States Army Nurse Corps
Cecilia Blomqvist (1845-1890), Finnish deaconess
Angela Boškin  (1885-1977), first professionally trained Slovenian nurse and social worker in Yugoslavia
Hilda Bowen (1923-2002), credited with establishing the modern nursing profession in The Bahamas
Jo Brand (born 1957), British nurse-turned-comedian
Elsa Brändström (1888-1948), Swedish World War I Red Cross nurse in Siberia
Mary Carson Breckinridge (1881-1965), founder of the Frontier Nursing Service
Vera Brittain (1893-1970), WWI nurse
Mary Francis Bridgeman (1813-1888), nun and Crimean War nurse
Ellen Johanne Broe (1900-1994) Danish nurse and nursing educator
Anna Broms (1862-1890), first trained nurse in Finland
Viola Davis Brown (1936–2017), first African-American to lead a state office of public health nursing in the United States
Abraão José Bueno (born 1977), Brazilian nurse and serial killer.
Carrie E. Bullock (1887-1962), African American nurse
Vivian Bullwinkel (1915-2000), lone survivor of the Banka Island Massacre, celebrated by the Australian Service Nurses Memorial
Elizabeth Burchill (1904-2003) was an Australian nurse, philanthropist and author
Betsi Cadwaladr (1789-1860), Welsh nurse who worked alongside Florence Nightingale in the Crimea
Amanda Cajander, (1827-1871), pioneer in the education of deaconesses and nursing in Finland
Maude E. Callen (1898-1990), American 20th century nurse-midwife
Vice Admiral Richard Carmona (born 1949), Surgeon General of the United States
Dr Peter Carter OBE, British nurse and general secretary of the Royal College of Nursing
Anne Casey, New Zealand-born pediatric British nurse who developed Casey's model of nursing
Edith Cavell (1865-1915), heroine of World War I
Maria Cederschiöld (deaconess) (1815-1892), pioneer in the education of deaconesses and nursing in Sweden
Ellen Christensen (1913–1998), Danish nurse and resistance fighter
Luther Christman (1915-2011), first male dean of a U.S. nursing program; established the Rush model of nursing
Dame June Clark (born 1941), Professor at University of Swansea
Louise Conring (1824–1891), first trained nurse in Denmark, head of Copenhagen's Deaconess Institute 
Lady Diana Cooper, prominent social figure in London and Paris, widely acknowledged as the beauty of the century

Cubah Cornwallis (died 1848), Jamaican nurse and "doctoress" who treated Nelson and William IV when they were stationed in the West Indies.
Paul Crawford (born 1963), pioneer of the field of health humanities
Evelyn May Cridlan (1889–1961), British nurse and ambulance driver in the First World War
Harriet Patience Dame (1815-1900), nurse during the American Civil War, served with the 2nd New Hampshire Volunteer Infantry.
Grace Ebun Delano (born 1935), pioneer of reproductive health services in Nigeria
Jane Delano (1862-1919), founder of the American Red Cross Nursing Service
Maria de Villegas de Saint-Pierre (1870-1941) founded the Saint-Camille Nursing School and directed the Élisabeth Hospital in  Poperinge during World War I
Edith DeVoe (1921-2000) 1st African-American nurse to serve in the regular Navy, World War II and Korean War nurse
Marion Dewar (1928–2008), mayor of Ottawa and a member of the Parliament
Louise Dietrich (1878-1962), suffragist and nurse in Texas
Dorothea Dix (1802-1887), superintendent of Army Nurses during the American Civil War
Josephine Dolan (1913-2004), nursing historian and educator at the University of Connecticut
Mary Donaldson, Baroness Donaldson of Lymington (1921-2003), Lord Mayor of London
Sister Dora (1832-1878), British 19th century nurse
Ellen Dougherty (1844-1919), first Registered Nurse
Rosalie Dreyer (1895-1987) Swiss-born, naturalized British nurse and administrator who led the conversion from a volunteer service to the profession of nursing in Britain
Diane Duane (born 1952) American science fiction and fantasy author

E-L

Sarah Emma Edmundson (1841-1898), Canadian-American author who served with the Union Army in the American Civil War
Victoria Joyce Ely (1889-1979), Florida's first licensed midwife. Conducted training programs for midwives in the state
Queen Fabiola of Belgium (1928–2014)
Saint Fabiola (died 399)
Helen Fairchild (1885-1918), World War I nurse
Florence Farmborough (1887-1978), British nurse who kept diaries of her service during World War I as a Red Cross nurse with the Imperial Russian army
Ainna Fawcett-Henesy, former Regional Adviser on Nursing and Midwifery for Europe for WHO
Ethel Gordon Fenwick (1856-1947), British nurse who campaigned for a law limiting nursing to "registered" nurses only
Erna Flegel (1911-2006), Adolf Hitler's nurse
Alma E. Foerster (1885-1967), American nurse who served in World War I, received the Florence Nightingale Medal (1920) and then worked in the United States Public Health Service
Elizabeth Warham Forster (1886-1972), American nurse who served the Navajo Nation and advocated for their retention of traditional medicine practices
Michiko Fujiwara (1900-1983), Japanese nurse who later became a politician
Genevieve de Galard, French nurse during the French war in Indochina
Nelly Garzón Alarcón (1932-2019), Colombian nurse, teacher; first Latin American nurse to be president of the International Council of Nurses
Eliza George (1808–1865), American Civil War nurse 
Abigail Hopper Gibbons (1801-1893), abolitionist activist during the American Civil War
Helen L. Gilson (1836-1868), American Civil War nurse
Marjory Gordon, nursing theorist and professor who created a nursing assessment theory known as Gordon's functional health patterns
Kate Gosselin, American television personality
Cornelia Hancock (1839-1926), American Civil War nurse
Jean Evelyn Headberry (1911–1993), Australian registered nurse and midwife and recipient of the Florence Nightingale Medal 
Lucille Hegamin (1894-1970), blues recording artist
Eliza Parks Hegan (1861–1917), Canadian nurse
Virginia Henderson (1897-1996), 'First Lady of Nursing", American nurse theorist
Bodil Hellfach (1856–1941), Danish nurse, deputy head of the Danish Nurses' Organization
Lenah Higbee (1874-1941), pioneering U.S. Navy nurse during World War I
Gerda Höjer (1893-1974), recipient of the Florence Nightingale Medal and President of the International Council of Nurses
Anna Morris Holstein (1825-1900), Civil War Nurse, Matron-in-Chief, from Gettysburg to Virginia, Author of Three Years in Field Hospitals Of The Army Of The Potomac
Dame Agnes Hunt (1867-1948), British Orthopaedic Nursing pioneer
Alberta Hunter (1895-1984), jazz singer
Rachela Hutner (1909-2008) Polish pioneer nurse, credited with establishing the modern Polish nursing profession
Euphemia Steele Innes RRC DN (1874–1955), Scottish nurse, matron of Leeds General Infirmary and of 2nd Northern General Hospital, founded Leeds Nurses' League
Calamity Jane (1852-1903), American frontierswoman and nurse
Sally Lucas Jean (1878–1971), American health educator and nurse
Victoria Jensen (1847–1930), deaconess, nursing supervisor, from 1914 head of Copenhagen's Deaconess Institute
Hazel Johnson-Brown (1927-2011), first African-American head of the United States Army Nurse Corps
June Jolly (1928–2016), British pioneer of children's nursing
 Liliane Juchli (1933-2020), Swiss nurse and author/editor of a highly influential nursing textbook
Ani Kalayjian Syrian born Armenian Ameriacan academic, nurse, and founder of Meaningful World
Carol Kefford (born 1958), British nurse and administrator 
Virginia Clinton Kelley (1923-1994), mother of United States President Bill Clinton
Dame Betty Kershaw, Professor at Sheffield
Eunice Muringo Kiereini, (born 1939), Chief Nursing Officer of Kenya and first African president of the International Council of Nurses
Docia Kisseih, (1919-2008), initiated advances in nursing and nurse training in post-independence Ghana 
Thora Knudsen (1861–1950), Danish nurse, trades unionist and women's rights activist
Ashley Leechin, American social media personality and nurse
Nancy J. Lescavage, Director of the Navy Nurse Corps
Daurene Lewis, first black woman mayor in North America.
 Janet Lim (1923-2014), nurse at St. Andrew's Community Hospital. She was the first nurse from Singapore to study in Britain. She was inducted as 2014 Singapore Women's Hall of Fame.
Mary Todd Lincoln (1818-1882), volunteer nurse during the American Civil War
Kate Lorig, professor at Stanford University School of Medicine
Ljubica Luković, (1858-1915) established the first nurses' training course in Serbia and in 1925 was posthumously awarded the Florence Nightingale Medal
Courtney Lyder (born 1966), first black dean of the UCLA School of Nursing

M-R

Mary, Princess Royal and Countess of Harewood (1897-1965)
Mary Eliza Mahoney (1845-1946), first professionally trained African-American nurse
Jeanne Mance (1606-1673), French nurse, founder of Hôtel-Dieu de Montréal (1645).
Sophie Mannerheim (1863-1928), pioneer of modern nursing in Finland
Marie Manthey (born 1935), one of the originators of Primary Nursing
Louise de Marillac (1591-1660), founder of the Daughters of Charity of Saint Vincent de Paul
Kate Marsden (1859-1931), British missionary nurse
Anna Maxwell (1851–1929), U.S. Army nurse whose activities were crucial to the growth of professional nursing in America
Carolyn McCarthy, American politician
Jean McFarlane, Baroness McFarlane of Llandaff
Louisa McLaughlin (1836-1921), one of the first British Red Cross nurses, served in two wars
Louise McManus, first nurse to earn a PhD Referred to as Louise McManus
Agda Meyerson, (1866-1924) pioneering Swedish nurse
Anne Milton (born 1955), British Member of Parliament
Jane Minor, aka Gensey Snow, 1792–1858, African-American healer, midwife, and slave emancipator
Naomi Mitchison (1897-1999), British novelist and poet
Jeannine Moquin-Perry, Canadian religious and political activist
Sarah Mullally (born 1962) British Chief Nursing Officer and Bishop of London
Charlotte Munck (1876–1932), Danish nurse, important figure in the training of nurses
Annie Murray (1906-1996) Scottish nurse who went to the Spanish Civil War
Razan al-Najar (1996/1997-2018), Palestinian nurse shot during a rescue in 2018 Gaza border protests.
Elizabeth Grace Neill (1846-1926), Kiwi nurse
Bonnie Nettles (1927-1985), co-leader of the Heaven's Gate religious cult
Nora Neve (1873-1952), pioneer of missionary nursing in Kashmir
Mary Ann Brown Newcomb (1817–1892, American Civil War nurse following the Battle of Fort Donelson 
Florence Nightingale (1820-1910), pioneer of modern nursing
Clara Noyes (1869-1946), enrolled 20,000 Red Cross nurses for World War I service, founded the first school for midwives in the U.S.
 Mary Adelaide Nutting (November 1, 1858 – October 3, 1948) was a Canadian nurse, educator, and pioneer in the field of hospital care.
Emily Elizabeth Parsons (1824-1880) American Civil War nurse, hospital administrator, and founder of Mt. Auburn Hospital
Emma Maria Pearson (1828–93), writer and one of the first British Red Cross nurses, served in two wars
Hildegard Peplau, first published nursing theorist since Florence Nightingale. She created the middle-range nursing theory of interpersonal relations
Anita Thigpen Perry, First Lady of Texas
Jill Pettis, New Zealand Member of Parliament
Lynne Pillay, New Zealand Member of Parliament
Kerry Prendergast, Mayor of Wellington, New Zealand
Tom Quinn, influential UK Professor of Cardiac nursing
Halima Rafat, pioneer Afghan nurse and women's rights activist, one of the first to nurses of her country
Emmy Rappe (1835-1896), Swedish pioneer in the education of nurses
Kaye Lani Rae Rafko, Miss America 1988
Claire Rayner (1931–2010), British journalist, agony aunt and activist
Linda Richards (1841-1930), America's first professionally trained nurse
Isabel Hampton Robb, helped develop early programs of nursing education
Rachel Robinson (born 1922), wife of baseball star Jackie Robinson
Debbie Rowe (born 1958), wife of singer Michael Jackson
Elaine Roe, U.S. Army nurse, one of the first four women to be awarded the Silver Star

S-Z

Margaret Sanger (1879-1966), founder of the U.S. birth control movement.
Betty Schmoll (1936-2015), founder of Hospice of Dayton, one of the first hospice programs in the United States.
Lynda Scott, New Zealand MP.
Mary Seacole (1805-1881), Jamaican British nurse in the Crimean War known as "the Black Florence Nightingale".
Schwester Selma (1884-1984), German-Jewish head nurse in Jerusalem, known as "the Jewish Florence Nightingale".
Flora Madeline Shaw (1864–1927), Canadian nurse and nursing teacher
Nigar Shikhlinskaya (1871-1931), first Azerbaijani nurse.
Kapelwa Sikota (1928 – 2006), first Zambian registered nurse.
Kathleen Simon, Viscountess Simon (1864-1955), British abolitionist.
Jessie Sleet Scales (1865-1956), first black public health nurse in the United States.
Myrah Keating Smith (1908-1994) nurse, midwife, only medical provider on Saint John, U.S. Virgin Islands for two decades
Mabel Keaton Staupers (1890-1989), advocate for racial equality in the nursing profession during era of American segregation.
Daphne Steele (1929-2004), Guyanese Matron, was the first Black Matron in the British NHS.
Margaretta Styles (1930-2005), American advocate for standardization of nursing credentials, University of California, San Francisco Nursing School dean, past president of the American Nurses Association and International Council of Nurses.
Adah Belle Samuels Thoms (1870-1943), pioneering African-American rights activist, who fought for African-American nurses to be permitted to serve in the U.S. armed forces.
Violetta Thurstan (1879-1978), nurse in WWI, decorated for bravery.
Annie Rensselaer Tinker (1884-1924), volunteer nurse in WWI, suffragist, and philanthropist
Sally Louisa Tompkins (1833-1916), humanitarian and philanthropist during the American Civil War.
Harriet Tubman (c. 1822-1913), African-American abolitionist.
Florence Wald (1917-2008), founder of the hospice movement in the U.S.
Lillian Wald (1867-1940), founder of visiting nursing in the U.S.
Jean Watson, an American nurse theorist and nursing professor, best known for her Theory of Human Caring.
Faye Wattleton (born 1943), president of the Planned Parenthood Federation of America.
Elizabeth Wettlaufer (born 1967), Canadian serial killer who murdered eight of her patients with insulin injections.
Walt Whitman (1819-1892), American poet, American Civil War nurse.
Sarah Palmer Young (1830-1908), American Civil War nurse, author of a memoir.
Tome Yoshida (1876-1963), Japanese nurse.
Sophie Zahrtmann (1841–1925), deaconess, nurse, head of Copenhagen's Deaconess Institute

See also
List of Danish nurses
List of African-American women in medicine

References

Lists of health professionals